Xu Shuangshuang (born 6 April 1996) is a Chinese athletics competitor. She competed in the women's 3000 metres steeplechase event at the 2020 Summer Olympics held in Tokyo, Japan.

In 2019, she competed in the women's 3000 metres steeplechase event at the 2019 World Athletics Championships held in Doha, Qatar. A year earlier, she competed in the women's 3000 metres steeplechase at the 2018 Asian Games held in Jakarta and Palembang, Indonesia.

References

External links 

 

Living people
1996 births
Place of birth missing (living people)
Chinese female middle-distance runners
Chinese female steeplechase runners
World Athletics Championships athletes for China
Athletes (track and field) at the 2018 Asian Games
Asian Games competitors for China
Athletes (track and field) at the 2020 Summer Olympics
Olympic athletes of China
20th-century Chinese women
21st-century Chinese women